Edward Francis Jemison, Jr. (born November 25, 1963) is an American film and television actor. He is known for his roles as Livingston Dell in the Ocean's film trilogy and Mickey Duka in The Punisher, as well as the television series Hung, iZombie and Chicago Med.

Life and career
Jemison was born in New Orleans, Louisiana, the son of Rosalie (née Centanni) and Edward Francis Jemison and is of Irish and Italian descent. He was raised in Kenner, Louisiana, and attended a Catholic secondary school, Archbishop Rummel High School. He graduated from Louisiana State University where he was a member of the Delta Chi fraternity.

Jemison has made multiple appearances on Late Night with David Letterman and starred in television pilots for NBC and ABC. He is also a veteran of the Chicago theatre scene where his stage credits include The Wizards of Quiz at the National Jewish Theatre; Only Kidding at the Wisdom Bridge Theatre; Loot at Tulane Repertory; A Christmas Carol at the Goodman Theatre; Talking to Myself and Holiday Memories at the Northlight Theatre; and T Bone N Weasel at Victory Gardens. Jemison also performed in The Two Gentlemen of Verona and As You Like It at the Chicago Shakespeare Theater.

In the mid-1990s, before launching a film career, he starred in a series of Bud Light commercials with the tagline "Yes, I am". Offered a contract to continue playing the character, Jemison instead chose to pursue music for a time, which prompted the creation of the "Budweiser Frogs". Online, Jemison starred in the web series Self Storage.

Filmography

Film

Television

Theatre

References

External links

1963 births
20th-century American male actors
21st-century American male actors
American male film actors
American male television actors
American people of Irish descent
American people of Italian descent
Living people
Louisiana State University alumni
Male actors from New Orleans